List of elected members of the German Bundestag from the Duchy of Lauenburg

Members
 Otto Christian Archibald von Bismarck (1953–1965) (CDU)
 Michael von Schmude (1994–1998) (CDU)
 Thomas Sauer (2002–2005) (SPD)
 Carl Eduard von Bismarck (2005–2007) (CDU), resigned on 10 Dec 2007
 Helmut Lamp (2007-) (CDU), replaced Bismarck

Bismarck family
Districts of Schleswig-Holstein
Herzogtum Lauenburg
List
Lauenberg